Super Hits is the second greatest hits compilation album by Alan Jackson. The album was re-released in 2007. It is part of a series of similar Super Hits albums issued by Sony BMG, the parent company of Jackson's label, Arista Nashville.

Track listing

Critical reception

Super Hits received two and half stars out of five from Stephen Thomas Erlewine of Allmusic. Erlewine concludes that the album is "entertaining" on its own terms but "simply doesn't deliver the hits it promises."

Chart performance
Super Hits peaked at #44 on the U.S. Billboard Top Country Albums chart the week of May 22, 1999.

Weekly charts

Year-end charts

References

Albums produced by Scott Hendricks
Albums produced by Keith Stegall
Alan Jackson compilation albums
1999 greatest hits albums
Arista Records compilation albums